Mace may refer to:

Spices
 Mace (spice), a spice derived from the aril of nutmeg
 Achillea ageratum, known as English mace, a flowering plant once used as a herb

Weapons
 Mace (bludgeon), a weapon with a heavy head on a solid shaft used to bludgeon opponents
 Flail (weapon), a spiked weapon on a chain, sometimes called a chain mace or mace-and-chain
 Ceremonial mace, an ornamented mace used in civic ceremonies
 Gada (mace), the blunt mace or club from India
 Kaumodaki, the gada (mace) of the Hindu God Vishnu
 Mace (spray), a brand of tear gas, often used by police
 MGM-13 Mace, a U.S. tactical surface-to-surface missile

Science and technology
 Major adverse cardiovascular events, a criterion for evaluating cardiovascular disease treatments such as angioplasty
 Malone antegrade continence enema, a surgical procedure used to create a continent pathway proximal to the anus
 Major Atmospheric Cerenkov Experiment Telescope, a telescope being built by ECIL to be placed at Hanle
 Models And Counter-Examples, a computer software for model generation
 Metal assisted chemical etching

Arts and entertainment
 Mace (G.I. Joe), a fictional character in the G.I. Joe universe
 Sgt. Colt "Mace" Howards, a fictional character in the 1988 animated TV series COPS
 Mace, a fictional character in the 1995 film Strange Days
 Mace, a fictional character in the 2007 film Sunshine
 M.A.C.E. Music, an American record label
 Mace: The Dark Age, a 1997 video game
 Mace Windu, a fictional character in the Star Wars universe

Businesses and organizations
 Mace (construction company), an international consultancy and construction company
 Mace (shop), a convenience store chain in the United Kingdom and Ireland
 Mace Security International, a manufacturer of personal defense products, e.g. Mace pepper spray 
 Mar Athanasius College of Engineering, an Indian engineering college
 Media Archive for Central England, a public sector regional film archive that collects, preserves and provides access to moving image material
 Metropolitan Architectural Consortium for Education

People
 Mace (surname), a list of people
 Mace (wrestler) (Dio Maddin; born 1991), American professional wrestler
 Mace Coronel (born 2004), American actor 
 Mace Francis (born 1978), Australian composer and academic 
 Mace Neufeld (1928–2022), American film producer

Places
 Macé, Normandy, France
 Mače, Croatia
 Mače, Slovenia
 Mace, Indiana, U.S.
 Hill 262 in Normandy, France, known as the "Mace" in World War II

Other uses
 Mace (spray), a brand of tear gas, often used by police
 Mace (unit), an English term for a traditional Chinese measurement of weight
 Mace debating, a particular style of debating
 Member of the Australian College of Educators

See also

Mase (disambiguation)
Maze (disambiguation)
 Mace's Hole, the former name of Beulah, Colorado, U.S.